Rachel Naomi Remen (born February 8, 1938, New York, New York) although trained as a pediatrician gained fame as an author and teacher of alternative medicine in the form of integrative medicine. She is a professor at the Osher Center of Integrative Medicine at the University of California, San Francisco. Together with Michael Lerner, she is a founder of the Commonweal Cancer Help Program, a cornerstone program at Commonweal. She is the founder of the Institute for the Study of Health & Illness. She has been featured on the PBS television series, Thinking Allowed.

Dr. Remen's most well-known books include Kitchen Table Wisdom and My Grandfather's Blessing, both of which made The New York Times Best Seller list. Kitchen Table Wisdom has been translated into 21 languages, and has sold over 700,000 copies worldwide. She is also the founder of a medical student curriculum called "The Healer's Art" used in medical schools throughout the United States.

References

External links 
 Rachel Naomi Remen's Web site 
  Cancer Help Program at Commonweal
 Interview featuring Rachel Naomi Remen on PBS series Healing and the Mind, by Bill Moyers 
 Dr. Remen's profile at the Osher Center for Integrative Medicine at UCSF 
 The National Library of Medicine (NLM), Changing the face of medicine: Celebrating America's Women Physicians - Dr Rachel Naomi Remen

1938 births
Living people
Writers from the San Francisco Bay Area
University of California, San Francisco faculty
American spiritual writers
20th-century American women writers
21st-century American women writers
Writers from New York City
American women non-fiction writers
20th-century American non-fiction writers
21st-century American non-fiction writers